Guinea competed at the 1984 Summer Olympics in Los Angeles, United States.

References
Official Olympic Reports

Nations at the 1984 Summer Olympics
1984
Oly